Epidaurus is a Greek city in the Saronic Gulf.

Epidaurus may also refer to:
 Epidaurus (mythology), once believed to have founded Epidaurus
 Epidaurus (Dalmatia), a Greek colony in the eastern Adriatic - modern Cavtat
 Epidauros (Stobreč), a Greek colony in the eastern Adriatic - modern Stobreč
 Epidaurus Limera, an ancient Greek city near Monemvasia, Laconia
 Epidavros Limira, a former province of Laconia, Greece